The W88 is an American thermonuclear warhead, with an estimated yield of , and is small enough to fit on MIRVed missiles.  The W88 was designed at the Los Alamos National Laboratory in the 1970s. In 1999, the director of Los Alamos who had presided over its design described it as "the most advanced U.S. nuclear warhead". As of 2021, the latest version is called the W88 ALT 370, the first unit of which came into production on 1 July, 2021, after 11 years of development. The Trident II submarine-launched ballistic missile (SLBM) can be armed with up to eight W88 warheads (Mark 5 re-entry vehicle) or twelve 100 kt W76 warheads (Mark 4 re-entry vehicle), but it is limited to eight warheads under the Strategic Offensive Reductions Treaty.

History 
Much of the work was done on the warhead by Los Alamos National Laboratory before the introduction of the Threshold Test Ban Treaty in 1976. A production run of 4000 to 5000 warheads was initially envisioned but production was halted after the November 1989 raid on the Rocky Flats Plant by the FBI. Consideration was given to restarting production but the program was terminated in January 1992. Final production was approximately 400 warheads.

Design revelations 
Information about the W88 has implied that it is a variation of the standard Teller–Ulam design for thermonuclear weapons. In a thermonuclear weapon such as the W88, nuclear fission in the primary stage causes nuclear fusion in the secondary stage, which results in the main explosion. Although the weapon employs fusion in the secondary, most of the explosive yield comes from fission of nuclear material in the primary, secondary, and casing.

In 1999, the San Jose Mercury News reported that the W88 had an egg-shaped primary and a spherical secondary, which were together inside a radiation case known as the "peanut" for its shape.   Four months later, The New York Times reported that in 1995 a supposed double agent from the People's Republic of China delivered information indicating that China knew these details about the W88 warhead as well, supposedly through espionage (this line of investigation eventually resulted in the abortive trial of Wen Ho Lee). If these stories are true, it would indicate a variation of the Teller-Ulam design which would allow for the miniaturization required for small MIRVed warheads.

The smaller warhead allows more of them to fit onto a single missile and improves basic flight properties such as speed and range.

The calculations for a nonspherical primary are apparently orders of magnitude more difficult than for a spherical primary. A spherically symmetric simulation is one-dimensional, while an axially symmetric simulation is two dimensional. Simulations typically divide up each dimension into discrete segments, so a one-dimensional simulation might involve only 100 points, while a similarly accurate two dimensional simulation would require 10,000. This would likely be the reason they would be desirable for a country like the People's Republic of China, which already developed its own nuclear and thermonuclear weapons, especially since they were no longer conducting nuclear testing which would provide valuable design information.

The weapon contains the material Fogbank. While its precise nature is classified, Fogbank is believed to be a foam or aerogel material used in the weapon's interstage.

See also 
 List of nuclear weapons
 Thermonuclear weapon
 Timeline of the Cox Report controversy

Explanatory notes

References

External links 
 W88 at the Nuclear Weapons Archive
 W88 at GlobalSecurity.org
 "Department of Energy, FBI, and Department of Justice Handling of the Espionage Investigation into the Compromise of Design  Information on the W-88 Warhead"—Statement by U.S. Senate Governmental Affairs Committee heads.
 PRC theft of U.S. thermonuclear warhead design information
 Report on the Government's Handling of the Investigation and Prosecution of Dr. Wen Ho Lee

Military equipment introduced in the 1980s
Nuclear warheads of the United States